The Jenaro "Tuto" Marchand Continental Championship Cup, or simply the Marchand Continental Cup, or Tuto Marchand Cup, is a warm-up friendly tournament for the FIBA Americas regional zone senior men's basketball championship, the FIBA Americas Championship. The tournament is often hosted by Puerto Rico. The tournament is named after Jenaro "Tuto" Marchand.

History 
The competition has taken place five times so far (2007, 2009, 2011, 2013, 2015), just before the FIBA Americas Championship. So far the senior men's national teams from Puerto Rico, Brazil, Canada, Dominican Republic and Argentina have competed at the tournament. Brazil has come out the winner of the tournament three times (2007, 2009, 2011), with Puerto Rico winning the 2013 edition. Canada is the current champion by winning the 2015 edition.

2007 Marchand Continental Championship Cup

2009 Marchand Continental Championship Cup

2011 Marchand Continental Championship Cup

2013 Marchand Continental Championship Cup

2015 Marchand Continental Championship Cup

Tropical Storm Erika 
The final day of competition at the 2015 edition was cancelled due to the weather conditions and the imminent passage of Tropical Storm Erika through Puerto Rico. This resulted in the final two games of the tournament between Dominican Republic–Brazil and Argentina–Puerto Rico to not be played. This meant the only team of the five to play all four of their games was Canada, but since they had already collected 8 points behind a 4–0 record, they already secured first place, thus resulting in Canada being named champions of the 2015 edition.

References 

Basketball competitions in the Americas between national teams
International basketball competitions hosted by Puerto Rico